Cordylus marunguensis, the Marungu girdled lizard, is a species of lizard in the family Cordylidae. It is a small, spiny lizard found in the Democratic Republic of the Congo.

References

Cordylus
Reptiles of the Democratic Republic of the Congo
Endemic fauna of the Democratic Republic of the Congo
Reptiles described in 2012
Taxa named by Eli Greenbaum
Taxa named by Edward L. Stanley